Vidojevica is a mountain in central Serbia, near the town of Prokuplje.

Astronomical station 

On the top of the mountain, there is an astronomical observatory operated by the Belgrade Observatory.

A  Cassegrain telescope was installed in spring of 2011. It was named "Nedeljković", after Milan Nedeljković (1857–1950), the first director and founder of Belgrade Observatory in 1887. In the next phase, in spring 2016, a  fully robotic telescope was installed at the station. It has been named "Milanković", after geophysicist, civil engineer and astronomer Milutin Milanković, who was the director of the Observatory from 1948 to 1951.

References 

Mountains of Serbia
Astronomical observatories in Serbia
Astronomy in Serbia
Rhodope mountain range